"I'm the One" is a song by American musician DJ Khaled featuring  Canadian singer Justin Bieber and American rappers Quavo, Chance the Rapper, and Lil Wayne. The song was released on April 28, 2017, by We the Best and Epic Records as the second single from Khaled's tenth studio album Grateful. On July 27, 2018, all artists, with the exception of Lil Wayne, were featured on Khaled's "No Brainer" from his eleventh studio album, Father of Asahd (2019). On October 19, 2020, the song surpassed one billion streams on Spotify.

Background
DJ Khaled initially marketed the song in February 2017 by posting photos of the music video on his Instagram account. He announced the song's release date, title, and cover art on April 24, 2017. According to DJ Khaled, Quavo completed his verse for the song in five minutes after listening to the instrumentals.

Composition
The song is written in the key of G major, following a chord progression of G-Em-C-D.

Chart performance
"I'm the One" debuted atop the Billboard Hot 100, becoming the first number-one single on the chart for DJ Khaled, Chance the Rapper, and Quavo (as a solo performer apart from Migos). It became the first hip hop song to do so since "Not Afraid" by Eminem in 2010. It became Bieber's fourth chart-topper, following the first three singles off Purpose. Lil Wayne topped the chart for the third time in his career, but for the first time since 2009. The song also entered the UK Singles Chart at number one, a first for DJ Khaled, Quavo, Lil Wayne, and Chance the Rapper; it was Bieber's fifth chart-topping song in the UK. It also entered at number one in Australia, Scotland, and Canada, and debuted in the top ten in countries including Germany, Ireland, and New Zealand.

Music video
The music video for "I'm the One", directed by Eif Rivera, was uploaded onto Khaled's YouTube channel on April 28, 2017. Models Alexa Lawrence and Iryna Ivanova and Quavo's fellow Migos members, Offset and Takeoff, make cameo appearances in the video.  The video was filmed at a luxury mansion in 26848 CA-1, Malibu, CA 90265, USA, erroneously reported to be Khaled's own. As of July 2022, it has received more than 1.6 billion views on YouTube.

Usage in media 
"I'm the One" is featured and remixed in YouTube Rewind: The Shape of 2017.

Track listing

Charts

Weekly charts

Year-end charts

Certifications

Release history

See also
 List of Billboard Hot 100 number-one singles of 2017
 List of number-one R&B/hip-hop songs of 2017 (U.S.)
 List of number-one rap songs of 2017 (U.S.)
 List of number-one singles of 2017 (Australia)
 List of number-one urban singles of 2017 (Australia)
 List of Canadian Hot 100 number-one singles of 2017
 List of number-one singles from the 2010s (New Zealand)
 List of UK Singles Chart number ones of the 2010s

Notes

References

2017 songs
2017 singles
DJ Khaled songs
Justin Bieber songs
Quavo songs
Chance the Rapper songs
Lil Wayne songs
Songs written by DJ Khaled
Songs written by Justin Bieber
Songs written by Quavo
Songs written by Chance the Rapper
Songs written by Lil Wayne
Number-one singles in Australia
Number-one singles in New Zealand
Number-one singles in Scotland
UK Singles Chart number-one singles
Billboard Hot 100 number-one singles
Canadian Hot 100 number-one singles
Epic Records singles
Songs written by Poo Bear
Songs written by Nic Nac
Songs written by Bobby Brackins
Song recordings produced by DJ Khaled
Pop-rap songs